Richard Jaeger (16 February 1913 – 15 May 1998) was a German politician of the Christian Social Union of Bavaria. Under Ludwig Erhard's second ministry, he was Minister of Justice (26 October 1965 – 1 December 1966).

From 1933, Jaeger was a member of Hitler's paramilitary organization, the Sturmabteilung (SA). From 1949 to 1980 Jaeger was a member of German Bundestag. From 1972 to 1974, Jaeger was President of the European Documentation and Information Centre (CEDI).

He was married and had six children.

References

External link
 

1913 births
1998 deaths
Politicians from Berlin
Justice ministers of Germany
Members of the Bundestag for Bavaria
Members of the Bundestag 1976–1980
Members of the Bundestag 1972–1976
Members of the Bundestag 1969–1972
Members of the Bundestag 1965–1969
Members of the Bundestag 1961–1965
Members of the Bundestag 1957–1961
Members of the Bundestag 1953–1957
Members of the Bundestag 1949–1953
People from the Province of Brandenburg
Grand Crosses 1st class of the Order of Merit of the Federal Republic of Germany
Members of the Bundestag for the Christian Social Union in Bavaria